This article covers the best practices and movement for reform in entrepreneurship policies in the United Arab Emirates.

Startup, ease of entry

For-profit companies

Best practices

The World Bank's 2010 Doing Business Report, Reforming through Difficult Times, ranks the United Arab Emirates as 33rd on the overall Ease of Doing Business, out of 183 economies worldwide. This is up from 47 on 2009, and ranks third in the Arab World and listed among the Top 10 Reformers. According to GEM 2009 Global Report, UAE has the highest increase globally in new startup activity 38% (Comparing 2006–2007) results to those in 2008–2009.
 Starting a new for-profit company in the United Arab Emirates, one of the 10 Doing Business indicators, became much simpler and quicker from 2000 to 2010, according to the 2010 report. The UAE's rank propelled from 118 to 44 as a result of numerous policies taken on in the last couple of years. 
The United Arab Emirates shortened the time for delivering building permits by improving its online system for processing applications.
Scrapping the minimum capital requirement and a reduction in number of days and procedures by eliminating the requirements to hire auditors, obtain an auditors’certificate and submit a director certificate.;as well as the requirement to show proof of deposit of capital for registration;
Dealing with Construction Permits: The cost has been reduced to half, Builders in Dubai can now apply for “no objection” certificates, building permits and completion certificates online and has cut 4 procedures and 33 days from the process of dealing with construction-related approvals; this improved the UAE's ranking from 54 to 27;
Trading Across Borders: Decrease in number of documents and time for export, combined with a reduction in cost to import and export by container; the UAE's ranking improved to five from 13 previously.
Sheikh Khalifa Bin Zayed Al Nahyan, President of the UAE issued a decree on 10 August 2009 amending Federal Law No 8 of 1984, the company law. The amendment removes the minimum capital requirement of AED 150,000 ($40,765) for the establishment of a limited liability company (LLC) in the UAE and is retroactive to companies established on or after 1 June 2009 and allows new businesses to determine the capital required for the establishment and sustainability of their companies. The amendment to the UAE company law addresses one aspect of the overall costs of doing business as represented by the costs of Starting a Business.

Non-profits, NGOs, hybrids
In the UAE NGOs are known as associations or societies for public welfare. Although the sector is relatively small, it includes a number of wealthy philanthropic organisations, which work internationally. Federal Law No. (2) of 2008 in respect of National Societies and Associations of Public Welfare defines and provides the framework for public welfare organisations operating within the UAE. This has replaced Federal Law No. (6) of 1974, and its amending laws, which previously governed public welfare societies operating within the country.

Foreign ownership
Despite significant barriers in creating uniformed ownership laws in United Arab Emirates,  the federal government has recently set a committee to draft the investment law of the country.  Drafting this law has proven to be a time-consuming job as each emirate in the country has different standards for foreign investment. This is because related laws such as land ownership, company formation and many others are different in all emirates.

Best practices
In March 2006, Sheikh Mohammed Bin Rashid Al Maktoum, Vice President and Prime Minister of the UAE and Ruler of Dubai passed the much anticipated property law for Dubai. The new law has recently been published in the Official Gazette and is now in force. The law is to be known as "The Land Registration Law of the Emirate of Dubai (No 7/2006)." Article 4 stipulates that "The right to own Land in the Emirate shall be restricted to citizens of the United Arab Emirates, citizens of the Cooperation Council for the Arab States of the Gulf, the companies totally owned by any of the foregoing, and public joint stock companies. Foreign Persons may, subject to the approval of the Ruler, be granted in certain areas the following rights: (a) The right to acquire absolute ownership of Land without restrictions as to time and (b) The right to acquire usufruct or leasehold of Land for a period not exceeding 99 years. It's expected that the residential market will benefit most from the change in the freehold and lease-hold laws, properties such as condo hotels may also see a surge in sales, now that one of the last objections to investing in dubai property by non-nationals has been eliminated.

Finances
UAE loses 3 places in this year’s Doing Business 2011 report in the ease of getting credit-from 72nd to 69th place.  Access to finance continued to be one of the leading constrains in starting a business in UAE. In 2006 survey conducted by Global Entrepreneurship Monitor (GEM), entrepreneurs were forced to rely on their own social networks to source funding.  Business angels, in the form of work colleagues, friends, neighbors  and even strangers had been a major source of funding. Accessing to funds from commercial banks remained difficult and limited in UAE.  In the joint survey of Union of Arab Banks and the World Bank on ‘The status of bank lending to SMEs in the MENA region,’ the average share of bank lending to small and medium enterprises (SMEs) was low- only 8% of their total lending in the MENA region. The average share of SME lending  is only 2% in the GCC in 14% in the non-GCC region. According to the Dun &Bradstreet “UAE SME Lending Report” report in 2008, SMEs constitute 85% of the businesses in the UAE and banks generally reject between 50% to 70% of the credit applications.  According to the report, 55% of the SMEs surveyed were not able to get the financing they needed.  Interest rates for unsecured loan lending are around 15%.

Best practices
In February 2007, the credit bureau, Emcredit, started collecting information on the repayment pattern of individual borrowers as well as firms. This has allowed better supervision of the debt level of banks and borrowers.  By 2010, access to credit was enhanced by setting up a legal framework for the operation of the private credit bureau and required that financial institutions share credit information

Seed capital, angel investing
In October 2007, Sheikh Mohammed bin Rashid Al Maktoum announced the opening of the Mohammed bin Rashid Al Maktoum Foundation, which was built to support future generations in devising sustainable homegrown solutions to regional challenges by spreading knowledge throughout the region and fostering ideas and innovation. the MBR Foundation is mandated to create a wealth of regional job opportunities during the next decade. his was the first step towards diversifying and growing Arab economies, and helped pave the way for the creation of the region's first Seed Capital fund and Business Angel network, the Arab Business Angel Network (ABAN).

Venture Capital
Venture Capital for a company becomes available if the company is beyond the start up phase, company's revenue stream brings in money into the business and have a quality team in place to run the business.  Several Venture Capital companies have come in during the last 10 years into UAE especially after 2010. In September 2017 a US$250 million fund was set up to back Tech companies in their growth stages.  This program was initiated by a person non other than the one who built the tallest tower in the world, Mr. Alabar.

IPOs
The initial public offering (IPO) of stock is how many entrepreneurs and the financiers who back them make their money, rewarding the risk of investing their capital and years of very hard work. (merger or acquisition is another "exit strategy".) A challenge in UAE and across the Arab world is that capital markets are weak, unstable, and have thin trading volumes that exacerbate volatility and the influence of non-market forces.

 Needed reforms
By law, if a company does not make payments to creditors for 30 days it must declare insolvency or face charges of bankruptcy by negligence, a criminal offense.
The World Bank, a major actor in economic policy, formally advised against the GCC adopting US Chapter 11-style bankruptcy laws.
The lack of structured bankruptcy laws and a banking system which has zero flexibility on loan repayments had forced many business owners to flee in fear of criminal sanctions.
There is also a need to encourage awareness of the legislation that already exists. This would enable businesses in difficulty to consider their options at the earliest possible opportunity. Such options may, depending on the circumstances, include entering into a formal or informal composition with creditors.

Rankings for selected Middle Eastern Countries

Notes:
n/a - not ranked
Ease of Doing Business - ranked among 189 Economies
GCI Index - ranked among 139 Economies
Economic Freedom Score - 0 to 100, where 100 represents the maximum freedom
Prosperity Index -The Prosperity Index assessed 110 countries, accounting for over 90 percent of the world's population, and is based on 89 different variables, each of which has a demonstrated effect on economic growth or on personal wellbeing. The Index consists of eight sub-indexes, i.e. Economy, Entrepreneurship & Opportunity (E&O), Governance, Education, Health, Safety & Security, Personal Freedom and Social Capital.
The ICT value falls on a scale of 0-10 and is calculated from three key indicators: number of telephone lines per thousand of the population, number of computers per thousand of the population, and number of internet users per thousand of the population. The top 10 per cent of states score in the range 9–10, the next highest 10 per cent of states score in the range 8-9 and so on.
Innovation System Index - The index value falls on a scale of 0-10 and is calculated from three key indicators: Total royalty payments and receipts in US$ per person, number of patent applications granted by the US Patent and Trademark Office per million people, and the number of scientific and technical journal articles published per million people. The top 10 percent of states score in the range 9–10, the next highest 10 per cent of states score in the range 8-9 and so on.
HDI - Calculated based on data from UNDESA (2009d), Barro and Lee (2010), UNESCO Institute for Statistics (2010a), World Bank (2010g) and IMF (2010a).
Education and Human Resources Score - The index value falls on a scale of 0-10 and is calculated from three key indicators: adult literacy rate, secondary enrolment, and tertiary enrolment. The top 10 per cent of states score in the range 9–10, the next highest 10 per cent of states score in the range 8-9 and so on.
Press Freedom Index- The lower the value of a state's press freedom index, the better the situation for press freedom, ranked among 178 countries.

Notes

Economy of the United Arab Emirates
Entrepreneurship